Kenneth Lawrence Rohloff (born April 18, 1939) was an American basketball guard for the St. Louis Hawks of the National Basketball Association (NBA). Rohloff was drafted as the sixth pick in the seventh round of the 1963 NBA draft. He appeared in two games for the Hawks in the 1963–64 NBA season and recorded 0 points and 1 assist.

Rohloff played for the Sunbury Mercuries of the Eastern Professional Basketball League (EPBL) from 1963 to 1965. He was named the EPBL Rookie of the Year in 1964.

References

1939 births
Living people
American men's basketball players
Basketball players from Paterson, New Jersey
Guards (basketball)
NC State Wolfpack men's basketball players
St. Louis Hawks draft picks
St. Louis Hawks players
Sunbury Mercuries players